is a Japanese footballer currently playing as a forward for Vegalta Sendai.

Career statistics

Club
.

Notes

References

External links

2003 births
Living people
Association football people from Saitama Prefecture
Japanese footballers
Association football forwards
Vegalta Sendai players